Disc and disk are both variants of the English word for objects of a generally thin and cylindrical geometry. The differences in spelling correspond both with regional differences and with different senses of the word. For example, in the case of flat, rotational data storage media the convention is that the spelling disk is used for magnetic storage (e.g., hard disks) while disc is used for optical storage (e.g., compact discs, better known as CDs). When there is no clear convention, the spelling disk is more popular in American English, while the spelling disc is more popular in British English.

Disk
The earlier word is disk, which came into the English language in the middle of the 17th century. In the 19th century, disk became the conventional spelling for audio recordings made on a flat plate, such as the gramophone record. Early BBC technicians differentiated between disks (in-house transcription records) and discs (the colloquial term for commercial gramophone records, or what the BBC dubbed CGRs).

UK versus U.S. 
By the 20th century, the "k" spelling was more popular in the United States, while the "c" variant was preferred in the UK. In the 1950s, when the American company IBM pioneered the first hard disk drive storage devices, it used the "k" spelling. Consequently, in computer terminology today it is common for the "k" word to refer mainly to magnetic storage devices (particularly in British English, where the term disk is sometimes regarded as a contraction of diskette, a much later word and actually a diminutive of disk).

Computer discs
Some latter-day competitors to IBM prefer the c-spelling. In 1979, the Dutch company Philips, along with Sony, developed and trademarked the compact disc using the "c" spelling. The "c" spelling is now used consistently for optical media such as the compact disc and similar technologies.

Medical editing
The words disc and disk can appear frequently in medical journals and textbooks, especially those in ophthalmology and orthopedics, and thus style guides often foster consistency by giving rules for which contexts take which spelling. AMA style for this topic is used by many publications. AMA says, "For ophthalmologic terms, use disc (e.g., optic disc); for other anatomical terms, use disk (e.g., lumbar disk). In discussions related to computers, use disk (e.g., floppy disk, disk drive, diskette) (exceptions: compact disc, videodisc)."

Sports
Disc sports, or disc games, are a category of activities which involve throwing and/or catching a flying disc. Participants of disc sports consistently use the "c" spelling when describing the sports equipment used in these activities, which includes team sports such as ultimate or individual sports such as disc golf.

References

Further reading 

 Apple Support Document HT2300:  What's the difference between a "disc" and a "disk?"

Disc
American and British English differences
Disc